Holidays in the Sun is the fourth studio album by Japanese singer-songwriter Yui. It was released on July 14, 2010.

Track listing
 Regular Edition

Limited Edition
Regular Edition + DVD

Charts and certifications

Charts

Sales and certifications

References

2010 albums
Yui (singer) albums
Gr8! Records albums
Japanese-language albums